Vazeilles-Limandre is a commune in the Haute-Loire department in south-central France in the region Auvergne.

Etymology
Vazeilles-Limandre (Vallilias is meaning " little valley" or "petite vallée" in French) has been known under various names through the centuries.

The distinction between Vazeilles-bas and Vazeilles-haut appeared during the 14th Century.

Vazeilles-bas: Villa inferior de Vazellas (1342); Vazellas inferior (1459); Vaselhas Bassas (1538)

Vazeilles-haut: Villa superior de Vazelhas (1347); Vazehlas Sobeyranas (1457)

Parochia de Vasilis (1470)

Vazaleiz (1511).

Vazeilles on the Map of Cassini (about 1769).

Geography
Vazeilles-Limandre is located at about 20 kilometres northwest of Puy-en-Velay and 30 kilometres southeast of Brioude.

The village is split in two parts, Vazeilles-bas and Vazeilles-haut.

In addition, the commune consists of the hamlets of Beauregard, Fressanges, Limandre, Ninirolles and Sauzet.

History
The discovery of archeological remains in the location of the commune shows a human presence at this time.

The first written documents doing reference to Vazeilles are the archives of Brioude in 969. They present Vazeilles as a "villa" depending on the vicar area of Saint-Paulien.

Population

See also
Communes of the Haute-Loire department

References

Communes of Haute-Loire